The 2021–22 Ferris State Bulldogs men's basketball team represents Ferris State in the 2021–22 NCAA Division II men's basketball season. The Bulldogs are led by 9th-year head coach Andy Bronkema and will play their home games at Jim Wink Arena in Big Rapids, Michigan as members of the GLIAC.

Previous season

Regular season
The Bulldogs finished 8–8 in the GLIAC and 9–11 overall in the 2020–21 season prior to the GLIAC tournament

Departures

Incoming Transfers

2021 Recruiting Class

Roster

Preseason

Preseason GLIAC Poll
In the Pre-season rankings for the GLIAC North, Ferris State was narrowly projected to finish second, just behind Michigan Tech.

Schedule and Results

|-
!colspan=9 style=| Exhibition

|-
!colspan=9 style=|Regular Season

|-
!colspan=9 style=|GLIAC tournament

|-

References

Ferris State Bulldogs men's basketball seasons
Ferris State
Ferris State